The 253rd Air Group was a unit of the Imperial Japanese Navy (IJN) during the Pacific campaign of World War II. The unit was formed on 1 November 1942 from the Kanoya Air Group and served in Rabaul and the Solomon Islands. The air group was disbanded on 10 July 1944.

References

Groups of the Imperial Japanese Navy Air Service
Military units and formations established in 1942
Military units and formations disestablished in 1944